Ribonucleate nucleotido-2'-transferase (cyclizing) may refer to:
 Ribonuclease T2, an enzyme
 Bacillus subtilis ribonuclease, an enzyme